Etta Baker (March 31, 1913 – September 23, 2006) was an American Piedmont blues guitarist and singer from North Carolina.

Early life and career
She was born Etta Lucille Reid in Caldwell County, North Carolina, of African-American, Native American, and European-American heritage. Baker began playing guitar at the age of three. She was taught by her father, Boone Reid, a longtime player of the Piedmont blues on several instruments. He was her only musical instructor. She played both the 6-string and the 12-string acoustic guitar and the five-string banjo. Baker played the Piedmont blues for nearly ninety years.

The family moved to Keysville, Virginia, in 1916. There were eight Reid children, four girls and four boys. All but one survived into adulthood. Each of her siblings played instruments. Occasionally, Baker, her father, and her sister, Cora, would play together at dances on Saturday night. Boone Reid worked a series of jobs during the 1910s and 1920s, occasionally taking work in factories and shipyards in other states. The rest of the family lived with an uncle. By the time Etta Reid was fourteen, the entire family worked on a tobacco farm in southern Virginia, which meant that they were together. She dropped out of school after tenth grade.

Baker was first recorded in the summer of 1956, after she and her father happened across the folksinger Paul Clayton while visiting the Cone mansion, in Blowing Rock, North Carolina, near their home in Morganton. Baker's father asked Clayton to listen to his daughter playing her signature "One Dime Blues".  Clayton was impressed and arrived at the Baker house with his tape recorder the next day, recording several songs. Clayton recorded five solo guitar pieces by Baker, which were released as part of the 1956 album Instrumental Music of the Southern Appalachians, which was one of the first commercially released recordings of African American banjo music. Baker was not monetarily compensated for these early recordings. Only after working with the Music Maker label later in life was she able to get rights back for this music.

Baker has said that she gets inspiration for chords through her dreams, stating that it is "like putting a crossword puzzle together". Baker has influenced many well-known musical artists, including Bob Dylan, Taj Mahal, and Kenny Wayne Shepherd.

Etta married Lee Baker, a piano player, in 1936 after courting for six years. They had nine children, one of whom was killed in the Vietnam War in 1967, the same year her husband died. For a while after these deaths, she stopped playing, but found she missed the consolation the blues brought her. She last lived in Morganton, North Carolina, and died at the age of 93 in Fairfax, Virginia, while visiting a daughter who had suffered a stroke.

Awards and honors
Baker received the North Carolina Folk Heritage Award from the North Carolina Arts Council in 1989, a National Heritage Fellowship from the National Endowment for the Arts in 1991, and the North Carolina Award in 2003. She was nominated for several Blues Music Awards (formerly the W. C. Handy Blues Awards): in the Traditional Blues Female Artist category in 1987 and 1989, and her album Railroad Bill in the Acoustic Album category in 2000. Along with her sister, Cora Phillips, she received the Brown-Hudson Folklore Award from the North Carolina Folklore Society in 1982.

Discography
 1956 : Instrumental Music from the Southern Appalachians (Tradition Records; reissued 1997)
 1991 : One Dime Blues (Rounder)
 1998 : The North Carolina Banjo Collection, various artists (Rounder)
 1999 : Railroad Bill (Music Maker)
 2004 : Etta Baker with Taj Mahal (Music Maker 50)
 2005 : Carolina Breakdown, with Cora Phillips (Music Maker 56)
 2006 : Knoxville Rag, with Kenny Wayne Shepherd, issued on CD as 10 Days Out: Blues from the Backroads, with a DVD showing Shepherd and Baker playing guitar in her kitchen (Reprise Records)
 2009: "Banjo" (Music Maker)
2015: "Railroad Bill" Vinyl Reissue (Music Maker)

References

External links

Etta Baker page from Music Maker Relief Foundation
Etta Baker Project Site to "promote and preserve the rich musical legacy of Etta Baker". Information, links and guitar tabs.
Etta Baker David Holt's memoirs of his mentor.

Obituary
Etta Baker MP3s, from Music Maker Relief Foundation
Live recording of "One Dime Blues," performed by Baker (track 7, recorded at the 1994 Florida Folk Festival and made available for public use by the State Archives of Florida)

1913 births
2006 deaths
People from Caldwell County, North Carolina
African-American banjoists
American blues guitarists
20th-century African-American women singers
Singers from North Carolina
Country blues musicians
National Heritage Fellowship winners
Piedmont blues musicians
Folk musicians from North Carolina
Musicians from Appalachia
Old-time musicians
African-American guitarists
20th-century American women guitarists
20th-century American guitarists
Guitarists from North Carolina
Rounder Records artists
Reprise Records artists
Tradition Records artists
20th-century American women singers
People from Morganton, North Carolina
Women banjoists
20th-century American singers
21st-century African-American people
21st-century African-American women
African American female guitarists